This is the list of current Belgian province governors.

Current governors

Past governors (since 1830)

Antwerp

Brabant (1830–1995)
1830  Pierre-François Van Meenen (temporary)
1830 - 1834   Feuillien-Charles-Marie-Joseph de Coppin
1834 - 1838   Goswin baron de Stassart (liberal)
1839 - 1845   Guillaume-Jean-Antoine baron de Viron
1845 - 1852   Charles Liedts (liberal)
1852 - 1855   P. Annemans (ad interim)
1855 - 1860   Charles Liedts (liberal)
1861 - 1862   P. Annemans (ad interim)
1862 - 1883   François Dubois-Thorn
1883 - 1884   Theodore Heyvaert (liberal)
1885 - 1906   Auguste Vergote
1906 - 1928   Henri Emile de Béco
1928 - 1935   François-André Nens
1935 - 1942   Albert Houtart
1942 - 1943 replaced by Jean-Mathieu Croonenberghs
1943 replaced by Frans Wildiers
1943 - 1944 vervangen door Adrien Gilles de Pelichy
1944 - 1945   Jean Herinckx (ad interim)
1945          Jules Hansez (ad interim)
1945 - 1951   Fernand Demets (liberal)
1951 - 1976   Jean de Neeff  (catholic party)
1977 - 1989   Ivan Roggen
1989 - 1995   André Degroeve (PS)

Flemish Brabant

Walloon Brabant

East Flanders

Hainaut

Liège

Limburg

Luxembourg

Namur

West Flanders

National Bank of Belgium
 François-Philippe de Haussy (1850–1869)
 Eugène Prévinaire (1870–1877)
 André-Eugène Pirson (1877–1881)
 Alexandre Jamar (1882–1888)
 Eugène Anspach (1888–1890)
 Victor Van Hoegaerden (1891–1905)
 Théophile de Lantsheere (1905–1918)
 Leon Van der Rest (1918–1923)
 Fernand Hautain (1923–1926)
 Louis Franck (1926–1937)
 Georges Janssen (1938–1941)
 Albert Goffin (1941)
 Georges Theunis (1941–1944)
 Maurice Frère (1944–1957)
 Hubert Ansiaux (1957–1971)
 Robert Vandeputte (1971–1975)
 Cecil de Strycker (1975–1982)

governors